Skin & Bone may refer to:

 Skin & Bone (album), a 1998 album by The Angels
 Skin & Bone (film), a 1996 film
 "Skin & Bones", a song by Jars of Clay from the 2013 album Inland

See also
Skin and Bones (disambiguation)